Hidden Valley Observatory  is an astronomical observatory owned and operated by Black Hills Astronomical Society.  Located just outside Rapid City, South Dakota (USA), the observatory sits on the edge of the Black Hills National Forest.  The grounds include an outdoor classroom and observation field.  The public is welcome on specific dates listed on the society's website.

See also 
List of observatories

References

External links
Hidden Valley Observatory Clear Sky Clock Forecasts of observing conditions. 

Astronomical observatories in South Dakota
Buildings and structures in Rapid City, South Dakota
Education in Pennington County, South Dakota
Tourist attractions in Rapid City, South Dakota
1960s establishments in South Dakota